Ofaiston is a monotypic genus of flowering plants belonging to the family Amaranthaceae. The only species is Ofaiston monandrum.

Its native range is Eastern Europe to Western Siberia and Central Asia.

References

Amaranthaceae
Amaranthaceae genera
Monotypic Caryophyllales genera